Aynehvar (also Romanized as Āynehvar; also known as ‘Aynevar and Eynaver) is a village in Eslamabad Rural District, Sangar District, Rasht County, Gilan Province, Iran. At the 2006 census, its population was 465, in 131 families.

References 

Populated places in Rasht County